Romanovo is a rural locality (a selo) in Brusentsevsky Selsoviet, Ust-Pristansky District, Altai Krai, Russia. The population was 155 as of 2013. There are 9 streets.

Geography 
Romanovo is located 22 km west of Ust-Charyshskaya Pristan (the district's administrative centre) by road. Brusentsevo is the nearest rural locality.

References 

Rural localities in Ust-Pristansky District